James Pattinson (15 December 1915 - 18 October 2009) was an English author of more than 100 thrillers.

Life
James Pattinson was raised in the village of East Harling, Norfolk. He attended Thetford Grammar School.

He volunteered for the Royal Artillery in 1939, and in 1941 was transferred to the maritime arm to serve as a gunner on DEMS. He served on convoys to Russia, in the Mediterranean and the Atlantic.

After the war he returned to poultry farming in Norfolk and began work on his first book in 1950.

He was unmarried.

Bibliography
Many of Pattinson's novels were based on his experience as a gunner on the Arctic convoys in World War II. His first published work was Soldier, Go North in 1954 and his last was The Unknown  in 2008.

 Soldier, Sail North (1954)
 Last In Convoy (1958)
 Contact Mr. Delgado (1959)
 The Rodriguez Affair (1970)
 The Murmansk Assignment (1971)
 The Sinister Stars (1971)
 Watching Brief (1971)
 Ocean Prize (1972)
 The Marakano Formula (1973)
 The Petronov Plan (1974)
 Special Delivery (1976)
 The Honeymoon Caper (1976)
 The Spanish Hawk (1977)
 The Courier Job (1979)
 Lethal Orders (1982)
 Obituary For Howard Gray (2003
 The Unknown (2008)

References

1915 births
2009 deaths
20th-century English male writers
British Army personnel of World War II
People educated at Thetford Grammar School
People from Harling, Norfolk
Royal Artillery soldiers